Audrey Joly (born 19 June 1998) is a Canadian synchronized swimmer, joining the national team in 2017. Fiola-Dion won a gold medal in the team artistic swimming category at the 2019 Pan American Games. She placed sixth in the team competition at the 2016 FINA World Junior Synchronised Swimming Championships. Joly was a training member of Canada's national team in the lead-up to the delayed 2020 Summer Olympics which were postponed as a result of the COVID-19 pandemic.

References

External links 
 

Living people
1998 births
Canadian synchronized swimmers
Artistic swimmers at the 2019 Pan American Games
Pan American Games gold medalists for Canada
Pan American Games medalists in synchronized swimming
Medalists at the 2019 Pan American Games
Synchronized swimmers at the 2020 Summer Olympics
Olympic synchronized swimmers of Canada